Temora may refer to:
 Temora Shire
Temora, New South Wales, a town in Australia
Temora Aviation Museum, a museum in the Australian town of Temora
Temora Post Office, historic commonwealth heritage site in Temora
Temora Herald and Mining Journal
Temora Airport
 Temora (Ellicott City, Maryland), listed on the NRHP in Maryland
 Temora (poem), a 1763 poem by James Macpherson
 Temora (crustacean), a genus of copepods in the family Temoridae